Following is a list of dams and reservoirs in Michigan.

Major dams are linked below.

Dams and reservoirs in Michigan 

This list is incomplete.  You can help Wikipedia by expanding it.

Alcona Dam, Alcona Dam Pond, Consumers Energy
Beaverton Dam, Ross Lake (Tobacco River), City of Beaverton
Big Quinnesec Dam, unnamed reservoir on the Menominee River, Wisconsin Electric Power Company
Cleveland-Cliffs Basin, AU Train River 
Cooke Dam, Cooke Dam Pond, Consumers Energy
Croton Dam, Croton Dam Pond, Consumers Energy
Crystal Falls Dam and Power Plant, unnamed reservoir on the Paint River, City of Crystal Falls
Edenville Dam, Lake Wixom on Tittabawassee River, Gladwin County, Hydro Power
Edison Sault Power Canal, St. Marys River (Michigan–Ontario), Lake Superior
Five Channels Dam, Five Channels Dam Pond, Consumers Energy
Fletcher Pond, Thunder Bay River
Foote Dam, Foote Dam Pond, Consumers Energy
Ford Dam, Black River
Ford Lake Dam, Ford Lake (Huron River)
French Landing Dam and Powerhouse, Belleville Lake, Weisenberger Mills
Greenwood Reservoir
Hardy Dam, Hardy Dam Pond, Consumers Energy
Hemlock Falls Dam, unnamed reservoir on the Michigamme River, Wisconsin Electric Power Company
Irving Dam, unnamed reservoir on the Thornapple River, Consumers Energy
Kent Lake Dam, Kent Lake, Huron River, Huron-Clinton Metropolitan Authority
Lake Isabella Dam, Lake Isabella, Chippewa River, Village of Lake Isabella
Ludington Pumped Storage Power Plant, pumped storage reservoir, Consumers Energy and Detroit Edison
Michigamme Falls Dam, Michigamme Lake, Wisconsin Electric Power Company
Mio Dam, Mio Dam Pond, Consumers Energy
Norway Point Dam, Lake Winyah, Alpena Power Company
Peavy Falls, Peavy Pond, Wisconsin Electric Power Company
Redridge Steel Dam, unnamed reservoir on the Salmon Trout River, Stanton Township
Rogers Dam, Rogers Dam Pond, Consumers Energy
 Sanford Dam, Sanford Lake on Tittabawassee River, Midland County, Hydro Power
 Secord Dam, Secord Lake on Tittabawassee River, Gladwin County, Hydro Power
Silver Lake Dam, Silver Lake Basin, Upper Peninsula Power Company
 Smallwood Dam, Smallwood Lake on Tittabawassee River, Gladwin County, Hydro Power
Sturgeon Dam, unnamed reservoir on the Sturgeon River, Wisconsin Electric Power Company
Tippy Dam, Tippy Dam Pond, Consumers Energy
Union Street Dam, Boardman Lake on the Boardman River, Grand Traverse County, Traverse City Light and Power
Way Dam, Michigamme Reservoir, Wisconsin Electric Power Company
White Rapids, unnamed reservoir on the Menominee River, Wisconsin Electric Power Company
Tower Dam, Tower Pond, Kleber Dam, Kleber Pond, Black River, Tower-Kleber Limited Parntership
Leland Dam, Lake Leelanau, Leland Dam Authority
Elk Rapids Dam, Elk River Chain of Lakes (Elk, Skegemog, Torch Lakes), Elk Rapids Hydropower
Victoria Dam and Reservoir, Rockland Hydropower

Smaller dams and reservoirs
Argo Dam, Huron River, City of Ann Arbor
Barton Dam, Barton Pond, Huron River, City of Ann Arbor
Flat Rock Dam, Huron River
Ford Lake, Huron River
Geddes Dam, Huron River, City of Ann Arbor
Lake Winyah, Thunder Bay River
Peninsular Paper Dam, Huron River
Reedsburg Dam, Muskegon River
Sturgis Dam, St. Joseph River
Superior Dam, Huron River, Superior Township

References 

Michigan
Dams
Dams